Henrique Pacheco de Lima (born 16 May 1985), simply known as Henrique, is a Brazilian footballer who plays as a defensive midfielder for Cruzeiro.

Club career
Born in Londrina, Paraná, Henrique started his professional career at Londrina Esporte Clube. He signed a professional contract with Londrina Junior Team on 1 September 2004, the affiliated club of Londrina (later became an independent club). He was loaned back to Londrina in 2004 and in January 2005 after extended his contract with the junior team. He played once in 2004 Campeonato Brasileiro Série B (on 25 September) and once in 2005 Copa do Brasil and left the club after the end of 2005 Campeonato Paranaense. He was loaned to Figueirense. and the loan was renewed on 1 February 2006 and 6 June. He also renewed his contract with the junior team on the same day.

In August 2007, he was transferred to J1 League club Júbilo Iwata. He then loaned back to Cruzeiro for 2008 season, along with Fabrício de Souza. In January 2009, the loan renewed. In the 2009 Copa Libertadores Final, Henrique scored the opening goal for Cruzeiro from over 18 yards out. However, Cruzeiro lost the game and the championship to Estudiantes de La Plata.

In January 2010, Cruzeiro bought him outright. He signed a new 5-year deal with the club. In March 2011, he got a call from Mano Menezes to be part of the Brazilian soccer squad for the first time.

On 3 January 2013, after two years playing for Santos, Henrique comes back to Cruzeiro.

Club Statistics

International career
Henrique was called up for the first time in 2011, by coach Mano Menezes, to friendly game against Scotland. He knew this when he was flying. On 19 January 2017, he came back to Brazilian Team being called up by coach Tite to friendly game against Colombia, six days later.

Honours

Club
Cruzeiro
Campeonato Mineiro: 2008, 2009, 2011, 2014
Campeonato Brasileiro Série A: 2013, 2014
Copa do Brasil: 2017, 2018

Santos
Campeonato Paulista: 2012
Recopa Sudamericana: 2012

Fluminense
 Taça Rio: 2020

References

External links
 
 

1985 births
Living people
Sportspeople from Londrina
Brazilian footballers
Association football midfielders
Campeonato Brasileiro Série A players
Londrina Esporte Clube players
Figueirense FC players
Cruzeiro Esporte Clube players
Santos FC players
Fluminense FC players
J1 League players
Júbilo Iwata players
Brazilian expatriate footballers
Brazilian expatriate sportspeople in Japan
Expatriate footballers in Japan